KAHU is a Hawaii Public Radio station on 91.3 MHz FM. It is licensed to Pahala, Hawaii, on the island of Hawaiʻi.

History
KAHU started broadcasting as a community radio station on June 28, 2010. The station later experienced financial trouble and was sold to Hawaii Public Radio on August 5, 2013. It began broadcasting again on November 6, 2013, airing Hawaii Public Radio's HPR-2 programming.

On February 14, 2017 KAHU changed their format from HPR 2's news, talk and jazz service to HPR 2's classical music service, as part of Hawaii Public Radio's realignment of its program services.

Construction permit
KAHU had a construction permit to move its antenna to a higher location, increase its power, and change frequency from 91.7 to 91.3 MHz. The license for this new facility was issued on October 21, 2016.

References

External links

AHU
Radio stations established in 2010
2010 establishments in Hawaii